For elections in the European Union, Overseas Territories was a European Parliament constituency in France until the 2019 European Parliament election. It consisted of all the inhabited French overseas departments and collectivities (including the sui generis overseas territory of New Caledonia, but excluding the non-permanently inhabited overseas territories that have no registered voters), even if their territory is not part of the European Union. Constitutionally, all French citizens are also granted the same European citizenship, consequently all of them elected representatives in the European Parliament, independently of their area of residence.

In 2019, France decided to switch to a single constituency for EU elections, putting an end to all regional constituencies, including the Overseas Territory of France constituency.

Composition

According to the provisions of Law No. 2007-224 of 21 February 2007:

Those eleven territories have different status with the European Union (none of them are part of the Schengen Area):
 The outermost regions (OMR) are part of the European Union. They include the five overseas departments of Guadeloupe, Guyane, Martinique, Mayotte and Réunion, and the overseas collectivity of Saint Martin.
 The overseas countries and territories (OCT) are not part of the European Union. They include the four overseas collectivities of Saint Barthélemy, Saint Pierre and Miquelon, French Polynesia and Wallis and Futuna, and the special collectivity of New Caledonia (the French Southern and Antarctic Territories and Clipperton Island do not vote for the European Parliament elections, as they have no permanent inhabitants).

The legal currency in those overseas territories is the Euro since 1999 (before then, it was the French franc), including in OCTs (by special agreement with the European Union) except those in the Pacific section which still use the CFP franc (bound to the Euro by a special agreement between France and the European Union, but with a revocable rate of 8.38 EUR for 1,000 XPF).

Results

2014

2009

2004

References 

Former European Parliament constituencies in France
Politics of Overseas France
Elections in Overseas France